George Taylor Shillito Farquhar (25 February 1857 - 30 July 1927) was an Anglican priest and author in the late 19th and early 20th centuries.

He was educated at Keble College, Oxford and ordained in 1881. He was Precentor of St Ninian's Cathedral, Perth after which he was Dean of St Andrews, Dunkeld and Dunblane until his death on 30 July 1927.

In 1890 George Farquhar published a book of sonnets.

References

Bibliography 
 George T.S. Farquhar, Sonnets, Perth 1890.

Alumni of Keble College, Oxford
Scottish Episcopalian priests
Deans of St Andrews, Dunkeld and Dunblane
1857 births
1927 deaths